Mouthless crab may refer to either of two species of terrestrial crab:

Cardisoma crassum, found in the eastern coastal Pacific from Baja California to Peru
Gecarcinus quadratus, also called the halloween crab

Animal common name disambiguation pages